Second Wind may refer to:

 Second wind, an exercise phenomenon
 Second wind (sleep), a sleep phenomenon
 Second Wind Fund, a youth suicide prevention program in Denver, Colorado, US
 Second Wind Systems Inc., a maker of wind-energy instrumentation, a subsidiary of Vaisala

Film
 Second Wind (1966 film) or Le deuxième souffle, a French film directed by Jean-Pierre Melville
 Second Wind (1976 film), a Canadian film directed by Donald Shebib
 Second Wind (1978 film) or Un second souffle, a French film directed by Gérard Blain
 The Second Wind or Le deuxième souffle, a 2007 French remake of the 1966 film, directed by Alain Corneau

Music
 Second Wind (band), a band formed by former Minor Threat bassist Steve Hansgen

Albums
2nd Wind or the title song, "Second Wind", by Todd Rundgren, 1991
 Second Wind, by Delbert McClinton, 1978
 Second Wind, by Herb Alpert, 1996
 Second Wind, by Brian Auger's Oblivion Express, 1972
 Second Wind, by BSS, 2023

Songs
 "Second Wind" (song), by Darryl Worley, 2001
 "You're Only Human (Second Wind)", by Billy Joel, 1985
 "Second Wind", by Kelly Clarkson from Piece by Piece, 2015
 "Second Wind", by Little River Band from Get Lucky, 1990
 "Second Wind", by Tracy Bonham from Down Here, 2000